2021 Ecuador prison riots may refer to:

February 2021 Ecuadorian prison riots
September 2021 Guayaquil prison riot
November 2021 Guayaquil prison riot